Giorgi Tsutskiridze (born 26 November 1996) is a Georgian Rugby Union player. His position is Flanker and he was playing for CA Brive in the Top 14. He has been currently playing for Aurillacois since 2017.

Biography
Trained at Soyaux Angoulême XV since 2005, Giorgi Tsutskiridze joined CA Brive in 2013 in the Crabos category.

He was selected in 2015 with the Georgia Under-20 team to compete in the World Junior Trophy. Two years later, he made his first international appearances with the first team: 
he wore the Georgia jersey for the first time in the match against Belgium, and made several other appearances during the year.

He joined Stade Aurillacois at the end of the 2017 off-season, and then joined the professional squad from the 2018-2019 season.

References

External links
 

1996 births
Living people
Rugby union players from Georgia (country)
Rugby union flankers
Georgia international rugby union players